Faginidae is a family of millipedes belonging to the order Chordeumatida. Adult millipedes in this family have only 28 segments (counting the collum as the first segment and the telson as the last), not the 30 segments usually found in this order.

Genera:
 Fagina Attems, 1904

References

Chordeumatida